Bonnetia maguireorum is a species of flowering plant in the Bonnetiaceae family. It is found only in Venezuela.

References

maguireorum
Endemic flora of Venezuela
Guayana Highlands
Vulnerable flora of South America
Taxonomy articles created by Polbot